M'Bout is a department of Gorgol Region in Mauritania.

List of municipalities in the department 
The M'Bout department is made up of following municipalities:

 Chelkhet Tiyad
 Diadibeny Gandega
 Edebaye Ehl Guelay
 Foum Gleita
 Lahrach
 M'Bout
 Souve
 Tarenguet Ehel Moul
 Tikobra

In 2000, the entire population of the M'Bout Department has a total of 77 816 inhabitants  (37 982 men and 39 834 women).

References 

Departments of Mauritania